Peter Frolo is a Slovak photographer.

A recipient of the journalism award for the Best Journalist Photograph in 2004, he also became known in his homebase as a member of the Photo Challenge jury in 2011.

Exhibitions
2011:  Orange JOJ Music Summer by Peter Frolo – JOJ Café, Aupark, Bratislava, Slovakia

Awards

References

External links
 Peter Frolo (official website)
 
 Peter Frolo (blog on Blogspot)

Living people
Slovak photographers
Year of birth missing (living people)